Henry de Worms, 1st Baron Pirbright PC, DL, JP, FRS (20 October 1840 – 9 January 1903), known before his elevation to the peerage in 1895 as Baron Henry de Worms, was a British Conservative politician.

Background and education

Henry de Worms was born on 20 October 1840. 
His father, Solomon Benedict de Worms (1801–1882), owned large plantations in Ceylon and was made a Hereditary Baron of the Austrian Empire by Franz Joseph I of Austria (1830–1916). His mother was Henrietta Samuel. His siblings were Anthony Mayer de Worms (1830–1864), Ellen Henrietta de Worms (born 1836), and George de Worms, 2nd Baron de Worms (1829–1902).

His paternal grandmother was Schönche Jeannette Rothschild (1771–1859), thus his paternal great-grandfather was Mayer Amschel Rothschild (1744–1812), the founder of the Rothschild banking dynasty. 
As a result, his paternal great-granduncles were Amschel Mayer Rothschild (1773–1855), Salomon Mayer von Rothschild (1774–1855), Nathan Mayer Rothschild (1777–1836), Carl Mayer von Rothschild (1788–1855), and James Mayer de Rothschild (1792–1868). His uncles, who owned plantations in Ceylon with his father, were Maurice Benedict de Worms (1805–1867) and Gabriel Benedict de Worms (1802–1881).

He was educated at King's College London. He was called to the Bar, Inner Temple, in 1863, and became a fellow of King's College in the same year.

Political career
De Worms served as Conservative Member of Parliament for Greenwich from 1880 to 1885 and for Liverpool East Toxteth from 1885 to 1895 and held office under Lord Salisbury as Parliamentary Secretary to the Board of Trade from 1886 to 1888 and as Under-Secretary of State for the Colonies from 1888 to 1892. 

He was British Plenipotentiary and President of the Conference on Sugar Bounties in 1888, and later served as a Commissioner for the Patriotic Fund. 
He was appointed a Privy Counsellor in 1888 and raised to the peerage as Baron Pirbright, of Pirbright in the County of Surrey, in 1895. He was elected a Fellow of the Royal Society in 1889.

His publications include England's Policy in the East, The Earth and its Mechanism, The Austro-Hungarian Empire and Memoirs of Count Beust.

Lord Pirbright died in January 1903, aged 62.

Family

They had three daughters:
 Alice Henrietta Antoinette (1865–1952)
 Dora Sophia Emily (1869–?)
 Constance Valérie Sophie (1875–1963), married Count Maximilian of Löwenstein-Scharffeneck, a nephew of Wilhelm, Prince of Löwenstein-Wertheim-Freudenberg. She was the mother of Hubertus, Prince of Löwenstein-Wertheim-Freudenberg, and the grandmother of Prince Rupert Loewenstein, manager of the rock band The Rolling Stones.

In 1887, he married Sarah, daughter of Sir Benjamin Samuel Phillips. .

Born Jewish, he was an active member of the Jewish community until he married a Christian woman. 
He then dissociated himself entirely from Judaism, and was buried at the Christian cemetery of St. Mark's in Wyke, Surrey.

The barony became extinct on his death as he had no sons. His second wife died in November 1914.

References

External links 
 thepeerage.com Henry de Worms, 1st and last Baron Pirbright
 
 
 The Pirbright Tomb

 
 

 
 

 
 

1840 births
1903 deaths
Alumni of King's College London
Fellows of King's College London
Fellows of the Royal Society
English Jews
Rothschild family
Conservative Party (UK) MPs for English constituencies
Members of the Privy Council of the United Kingdom
Pirbright
UK MPs 1880–1885
UK MPs 1885–1886
UK MPs 1886–1892
UK MPs 1892–1895
UK MPs who were granted peerages
Jewish British politicians
Converts to Anglicanism from Judaism
English people of German-Jewish descent
Parliamentary Secretaries to the Board of Trade
Peers of the United Kingdom created by Queen Victoria